Eugenia horizontalis is a species of plant in the family Myrtaceae. It is endemic to New Caledonia.

References

Endemic flora of New Caledonia
Vulnerable plants
horizontalis
Taxonomy articles created by Polbot
Taxobox binomials not recognized by IUCN 
Taxa named by Adolphe-Théodore Brongniart
Taxa named by Jean Antoine Arthur Gris
Taxa named by Jean Armand Isidore Pancher